In the mathematical discipline of general topology, Stone–Čech compactification (or Čech–Stone compactification) is a technique for constructing a universal map from a topological space X to a compact Hausdorff space βX. The Stone–Čech compactification βX of a topological  space X is the largest, most general compact Hausdorff space "generated" by X, in the sense that any continuous map from X to a compact Hausdorff space factors through βX (in a unique way). If X is a Tychonoff space then the map from X to its image in βX is a homeomorphism, so X can be thought of as a (dense) subspace of βX; every other compact Hausdorff space that densely contains X is a quotient of βX. For general topological spaces X, the map from X to βX need not be injective.

A form of the axiom of choice is required to prove that every topological space has a Stone–Čech compactification. Even for quite simple spaces X, an accessible concrete description of βX often remains elusive. In particular, proofs that βX \ X is nonempty do not give an explicit description of any particular point in βX \ X.

History 

Andrey Nikolayevich Tikhonov introduced completely regular spaces in 1930 in order to avoid the pathological situation of Hausdorff spaces whose only continuous real-valued functions are constant maps.

In the same 1930 article where Tychonoff defined completely regular spaces, he also proved that every Tychonoff space (i.e. Hausdorff completely regular space) has a Hausdorff compactification (in this same article, he also proved Tychonoff's theorem). 
In 1937, Čech extended Tychonoff's technique and introduced the notation βX for this compactification. 
Stone also constructed βX in a 1937 article, although using a very different method. 
Despite Tychonoff's article being the first work on the subject of the Stone–Čech compactification and despite Tychonoff's article being referenced by both Stone and Čech, Tychonoff's name is rarely associated with βX.

Universal property and functoriality 

The Stone–Čech compactification of the topological space X is a compact Hausdorff space  βX together with a continuous map iX : X → βX that has the following universal property: any continuous map f : X → K, where K is a compact Hausdorff space, extends uniquely to a continuous map βf : βX → K, i.e. (βf)iX = f .

As is usual for universal properties, this universal property characterizes βX up to homeomorphism.

Some authors add the assumption  that the starting space X be Tychonoff (or even locally compact Hausdorff), for the following reasons:
The map from X  to its image in  βX is a homeomorphism if and only if X is Tychonoff. 
The map from X to its image  in βX is a homeomorphism to an open subspace  if and only if X is locally compact Hausdorff.
The Stone–Čech construction can be performed for more general spaces X, but in that case the map X → βX need not be a homeomorphism to the image of X  (and sometimes is not even injective).

As is usual for universal constructions like this, the extension property makes β a functor from Top (the category of topological spaces) to CHaus (the category of compact Hausdorff spaces). Further, if we let U be the inclusion functor from CHaus into Top, maps from βX to K (for K in CHaus) correspond bijectively to maps from X to UK (by considering their restriction to X and using the universal property of βX). i.e. 
Hom(βX, K) ≅ Hom(X, UK), 
which means that β is left adjoint to U. This implies that CHaus is a reflective subcategory of Top with reflector β.

Examples 
If X is a compact Hausdorff space, then it coincides with its Stone–Čech compactification.  Most other Stone–Čech compactifications lack concrete descriptions and are extremely unwieldy. Exceptions include:  

The Stone–Čech compactification of the first uncountable ordinal , with the order topology, is the ordinal . The Stone–Čech compactification of the deleted Tychonoff plank is the Tychonoff plank.

Constructions

Construction using products
One attempt to construct the Stone–Čech compactification of X is to take the closure of the image of X in

where the product is over all maps from X to compact Hausdorff spaces K (or, equivalently, the image of X by the right Kan extension of the identity functor of the category CHaus of compact Hausdorff spaces along the inclusion functor of CHaus into the category Top of general topological spaces). By Tychonoff's theorem this product of compact spaces is compact, and the closure of X in this space is therefore also compact. This works intuitively but fails for the technical reason that  the collection of all such maps is a proper class rather than a set. There are several ways to modify this idea to make it work; for example, one can restrict the compact Hausdorff spaces K to have underlying set P(P(X)) (the power set of the power set of X), which is sufficiently large that it has cardinality at least equal to that of every compact Hausdorff space to which X can be mapped with dense image.

Construction using the unit interval
One way of constructing βX is to let C be the set of all continuous functions from X into [0, 1] and consider the map  where 

This may be seen to be a continuous map onto its image, if [0, 1]C is given the product topology. By Tychonoff's theorem we have that [0, 1]C is compact since [0, 1] is. Consequently, the closure of X in [0, 1]C is a compactification of X.

In fact, this closure is the Stone–Čech compactification. To verify this, we just need to verify that the closure satisfies the appropriate universal property. We do this first for K = [0, 1], where the desired extension of f : X → [0, 1] is just the projection onto the f coordinate in [0, 1]C. In order to then get this for general compact Hausdorff K we use the above to note that K can be embedded in some cube, extend each of the coordinate functions and then take the product of these extensions.

The special property of the unit interval needed for this construction to work is that it is a cogenerator of the category of compact Hausdorff spaces: this means that if A and B are compact Hausdorff spaces, and f and g are distinct maps from A to B, then there is a map h : B → [0, 1] such that hf and hg are distinct. Any other cogenerator (or cogenerating set) can be used in this construction.

Construction using ultrafilters

Again we verify the universal property: For  with  compact Hausdorff and  an ultrafilter on  we have an ultrafilter base  on  the pushforward of  This has a unique limit because  is compact Hausdorff, say  and we define  This may be verified to be a continuous extension of 

This is really the same construction, as the Stone space of this Boolean algebra is the set of ultrafilters (or equivalently prime ideals, or homomorphisms to the 2 element Boolean algebra) of the Boolean algebra, which is the same as the set of ultrafilters on 

The construction can be generalized to arbitrary Tychonoff spaces by using maximal filters of zero sets instead of ultrafilters. (Filters of closed sets suffice if the space is normal.)

Construction using C*-algebras
The Stone–Čech compactification is naturally homeomorphic to the spectrum of Cb(X). Here Cb(X) denotes the C*-algebra of all continuous bounded complex-valued functions on X with sup-norm. Notice that Cb(X) is canonically isomorphic to the multiplier algebra of C0(X).

The Stone–Čech compactification of the natural numbers
In the case where X is locally compact, e.g. N or R, the image of X forms an open subset of βX, or indeed of any compactification, (this is also a necessary condition, as an open subset of a compact Hausdorff space is locally compact). In this case one often studies the remainder of the space, βX \ X. This is a closed subset of βX, and so is compact. We consider N with its discrete topology and write βN \ N = N* (but this does not appear to be standard notation for general X).

As explained above, one can view βN as the set of ultrafilters on N, with the topology generated by sets of the form  for U a subset of N. The set N corresponds to the set of principal ultrafilters, and the set N* to the set of free ultrafilters.

The study of βN, and in particular N*, is a major area of modern set-theoretic topology. The major results motivating this are Parovicenko's theorems, essentially characterising its behaviour under the assumption of the continuum hypothesis.

These state:

 Every compact Hausdorff space of weight at most  (see Aleph number) is the continuous image of N* (this does not need the continuum hypothesis, but is less interesting in its absence).
 If the continuum hypothesis holds then N* is the unique Parovicenko space, up to isomorphism.

These were originally proved by considering Boolean algebras and applying Stone duality.

Jan van Mill has described βN as a "three headed monster"—the three heads being a smiling and friendly head (the behaviour under the assumption of the continuum hypothesis), the ugly head of independence which constantly tries to confuse you (determining what behaviour is possible in different models of set theory), and the third head is the smallest of all (what you can prove about it in ZFC). It has relatively recently been observed that this characterisation isn't quite right—there is in fact a fourth head of βN, in which forcing axioms and Ramsey type axioms give properties of βN almost diametrically opposed to those under the continuum hypothesis, giving very few maps from N* indeed. Examples of these axioms include the combination of Martin's axiom and the Open colouring axiom which, for example, prove that (N*)2 ≠ N*, while the continuum hypothesis implies the opposite.

An application: the dual space of the space of bounded sequences of reals 
The Stone–Čech compactification βN can be used to characterize  (the Banach space of all bounded sequences in the scalar field R or C, with supremum norm) and its dual space.

Given a bounded sequence  there exists a closed ball B in the scalar field that contains the image of a. a is then a function from N to B. Since N is discrete and B is compact and Hausdorff, a is continuous. According to the universal property, there exists a unique extension βa : βN → B. This extension does not depend on the ball B we consider.

We have defined an extension map from the space of bounded scalar valued sequences to the space of continuous functions over βN.

This map is bijective since every function in C(βN) must be bounded and can then be restricted to a bounded scalar sequence.

If we further consider both spaces with the sup norm the extension map becomes an isometry. Indeed, if in the construction above we take the smallest possible ball B, we see that the sup norm of the extended sequence does not grow (although the image of the extended function can be bigger).

Thus,  can be identified with C(βN). This allows us to use the Riesz representation theorem and find that the dual space of  can be identified with the space of finite Borel measures on βN.

Finally, it should be noticed that this technique generalizes to the L∞ space of an arbitrary measure space X. However, instead of simply considering the space βX of ultrafilters on X, the right way to generalize this construction is to consider the Stone space Y of the measure algebra of X: the spaces C(Y) and L∞(X) are isomorphic as C*-algebras as long as X satisfies a reasonable finiteness condition (that any set of positive measure contains a subset of finite positive measure).

A monoid operation on the Stone–Čech compactification of the naturals
The natural numbers form a monoid under addition. It turns out that this operation can be extended (generally in more than one way, but uniquely under a further condition) to βN, turning this space also into a monoid, though rather surprisingly a non-commutative one.

For any subset, A, of N and a positive integer n in N, we define

Given two ultrafilters F and G on N, we define their sum by 

it can be checked that this is again an ultrafilter, and that the operation + is associative (but not commutative) on βN and extends the addition on N; 0 serves as a neutral element for the operation + on βN. The operation is also right-continuous, in the sense that for every ultrafilter F, the map

is continuous.

More generally, if S is a semigroup with the discrete topology, the operation of S can be extended to βS, getting a right-continuous associative operation.

See also

 
 Corona set of a space, the complement of its image in the Stone–Čech compactification.

Notes

References

External links
 Stone-Čech Compactification at Planet Math
 Dror Bar-Natan, Ultrafilters, Compactness, and the Stone–Čech compactification

General topology
Compactification (mathematics)